Andrea Baroni Peretti (1572–1629) was a Catholic cardinal.

Biography
On 30 November 1624, he was consecrated bishop by Sebastiano Poggi, Bishop Emeritus of Ripatransone, with Lorenzo Azzolini, Bishop of Ripatransone, and Aloysius Galli, Bishop of Ancona e Numana, serving as co-consecrators.

References

1572 births
1629 deaths
17th-century Italian cardinals